Eileen Mabel Gibb (3 August 1911 – 2003) was a British author. She is best known for writing the Sammy  the Shunter series of books using the name Eileen Gibb as opposed to her married name of Holder.

Biography
Gibb was born on 3 August 1911 to parents Benjamin and Mabel in Croydon, Surrey.  During the Second World War Gibb was secretary to the art historian and National Gallery director Kenneth Clark, and this introduced her to a wide variety of friends in artistic and writing circles including Henry Moore, Stanley Spencer and Philip Larkin.  Gibb married John Terrance Holder in 1942 and became a member of a family with an enthusiasm for railways, her father in-law John Alexander Holder being a brewer, founder director of the Romney, Hythe and Dymchurch Railway and owner of Broome House, Broome, Worcestershire with its own miniature railway that was later to move to Keeping House, Beaulieu, Hampshire.  Her husband, who rose to rank of Major in the Royal Engineers during the war, had served an apprenticeship as an engine driver on the Romney, Hythe and Dymchurch Railway before the war and was to serve as its manager post-war until 1948 until becoming sales manager of Ian Allan.  From 1953 he was circulation manager of The Economist and later was a director  at Ian Allan and The Economist.  When he was appointed managing director of the Dart Valley Railway (DVR) in 1970 both Gibb and her husband were expected to spend much time away from their home in Cobham, Surrey to assist in the proceedings of the DVR.  Gibb's work at the DVR including unveiling the restored coach Vicky that had been used by Queen victoria.   Gibb had two children, her daughter commenting: "I think this exposure to so much railway stuff must have fired mum's imagination to produce her stories".  Other work including contributions to the Robin children's magazine including Tubby the Odd-job Engine.  Gibb ceased writing around 1969 but maintained an interest in artistic projects  until her death in 2003.

Work

Sammy the Shunter
Sammy the Shunter is a fictional anthropomorphic steam locomotive character created by Eileen Gibb, featuring in a series of children's books published in the 1940s and 1950s.  Sammy is depicted as a  locomotive, painted red with green wheels and a yellow dome who lives in the fictional town of Sleeping Sunbury in England. The various books tell of Sammy's adventures all over the world.  They are mostly nearly 30 pages long, though Sammy the Shunter Bumper Book is closer to 60 pages.  Sammy the Shunter also appears in the stories "The Holiday Train" and "Sammy on the Christmas Tree, featured in My Trains Book.

Sammy the Shunter was demonstrated in an O gauge layout at Railwayland, Scarborough and Brighton by Harold Elliot, Eliiot being known for his hilarious antics while demonstrating.

The stories of The Railway Series (Thomas the Tank Engine) surpassed in popularity those of Sammy the Shunter, with many people attending Thomas events in the United States and the United Kingdom.

Characters
 Sammy is the main character throughout the books. He is a friendly 2-4-2T steam shunter painted red with green wheels, yellow buffers, blue running plates and yellow lining with his nameplate on his sides in yellow. In the first book, Sammy used to be a rusty colour and had a number 109846 before being repainted.
 Mr. Buffin is Sammy's driver. He is a kind old man who is seen with Sammy on his adventures. It is mentioned in "Sammy Gets Streamlined" that he was meant to drive the Flying Scotsman but things had gone wrong. Mr. Buffin has a fear of wild animals.
 Mr. Plum is the stationmaster of Sleeping Sunbury station. Mr. Plum is a strict man with a short temper who addressed Sammy by his number in the earlier books, but has a kinder side.

Billy the Bus
Gibb published Billy the bus. No 1 Billy and the robbers (1953, Ian Allan), and Billy the bus. No 2 Billy goes exploring.

Robin magazine
Gibb contributed to Robin children's magazine in the 1950s and 1960s with tales of Tubby the odd-job engine and other characters.

Jigsaws 

Two untitled series of four plywood c 30 piece jigsaws  5 3/4" x 7 3/4" featuring Sammy were produced in the 1950s by High Spot. The jigsaws were not individually titled. They are scarce but do come up from time to time on Ebay.
They can be differentiated as follows:

Series A

The images on the box lid tops are all centered with a "SERIES OF FOUR" label below and no text on the lid sides. The jigsaws are all portrait orientation with themes as follows:

 At the Rodeo
 At the Horse Race
 At the Zoo
 At the Fireworks Display

Series B

The images on the box lid tops are to the lower left and follow an American cowboy theme. The " series of four" label and "ALL INTERLOCKING"  are printed on sides of the box lids. There are two portrait and two landscape images:

 In America 1
 In America 2
 In America 3
 In America 4

Bibliography

 
 
 
 
 
 
 
  
 .

References

Notes

Footnotes

Sources
 
 
 
 
 
 
 

1911 births
2003 deaths
20th-century British women writers
British women children's writers
British children's writers
People from Croydon